Yevgeni Gennadievich Koreshkov (born 11 March 1970 in Ust Kamenogorsk, Kazakh SSR, Soviet Union) is a Kazakhstani former ice hockey player of Russian descent and a Russian ice hockey coach. He is a younger brother of Alexander Koreshkov.

Playing career
He is the graduate of Torpedo Ust-Kamenogorsk ice hockey school. Koreshkov played in Russia for HC Lada Togliatti, Metallurg Magnitogorsk, Sibir Novosibirsk, Severstal Cherepovets and Mechel Chelyabinsk.  He also played for the Kazakhstan in the 1998 and 2006 Winter Olympics.  In the 2006 tournament, he scored five goals in five games before Kazakhstan were eliminated in the preliminary round of the tournament.

Koreshkov is currently employed as the head coach of MHL's Stalnye Lisy.

Personal
He also holds Russian citizenship.

Career statistics

Regular season and playoffs

International

References

External links

1970 births
Asian Games medalists in ice hockey
Asian Games silver medalists for Kazakhstan
Expatriate ice hockey players in Russia
HC Lada Togliatti players
HC Mechel players
HC Sibir Novosibirsk players
Ice hockey players at the 1998 Winter Olympics
Ice hockey players at the 2006 Winter Olympics
Ice hockey players at the 2007 Asian Winter Games
Kazakhstani ice hockey centres
Kazakhstani ice hockey coaches
Kazakhstani people of Russian descent
Kazzinc-Torpedo players
Living people
Medalists at the 2007 Asian Winter Games
Metallurg Magnitogorsk players
Olympic ice hockey players of Kazakhstan
Severstal Cherepovets players
Soviet ice hockey centres
Sportspeople from Oskemen